Love and Sex may refer to:

 Love & Sex, 2000 American film written and directed by Valerie Breiman
 Love & Sex (album), 2014 album by Plan B
 "Love & Sex, Pt. 2", a 2014 single by Joe

See also
 Love and Sex with Robots, a 2007 book by David Levy
 Anarchism and issues related to love and sex